The 2021 IIHF Women's World Championship Division I was scheduled to be two international ice hockey tournaments organised by the International Ice Hockey Federation. The Division I Group A tournament would have been held in Angers, France, from 11 to 18 April 2021 and the Division I Group B tournament in Beijing, China, from 8 to 14 April 2021.

On 18 November 2020, both tournaments were cancelled due to the COVID-19 pandemic.

Division I Group A

Participants

Standings

Division I Group B

Participants

Standings

References

External links
Official website of IIHF

2021
Division I
2021 IIHF Women's World Championship Division I
2021 IIHF Women's World Championship Division I
Sports competitions in Beijing
2021 in French sport
2021 in Chinese sport
2021 in French women's sport
2021 in Chinese women's sport
IIHF Women's World Championship Division I
April 2021 sports events in China
IIHF Women's World Championship Division I, 2021